Harlem School District No. 122, commonly called Harlem Consolidated School District, is a unit school district in eastern Winnebago County, Illinois.  It is headquartered in Machesney Park and covers most of Loves Park, Machesney Park, and southern Roscoe, Illinois.

, the district has:
 1 Pre-K/kindergarten: Parker Early Education Center)
 8 elementary schools: Loves Park Elementary, Machesney Elementary, Maple Elementary, Marquette Elementary, Olson Park Elementary, Ralston Elementary, Rock Cut Elementary, and Windsor Elementary
 1 middle school: Harlem Middle School
 1 high school: Harlem High School

History

Old school districts
Schools that were closed when Harlem Consolidated was formed include Lovejoy School (District No. 49) in Harlem Township.

Harlem Village School District No. 55 operated the Harlem Village School.  The schoolhouse, later Harlem Township Hall, was torn down some time after July 1989.

Harlem Consolidated School District
Harlem Consolidated School District No. 122 was formed in April 1910.

The Harlem Consolidated School, on the corner of Harlem Road and North Second Street, was completed on March 6, 1911, at a cost of $17,700; was dedicated on April 26, 1911, and also opened in 1911.

Loves Park Grade School was built in 1916 at 344 Grand Avenue in Loves Park.

References

1910 establishments in Illinois
Education in Winnebago County, Illinois
School districts in Illinois
School districts established in 1910